Commissionaire is a 1933 British crime film directed by Edward Dryhurst and starring Sam Livesey, Barry Livesey and George Carney. It was shot at Cricklewood Studios as a quota quickie for release by MGM.

Plot
A Commissionaire is suspected of a robbery committed by his son.

Cast
 Sam Livesey as Sergeant George Brown 
 Barry Livesey as Tom Brown 
 George Carney as Sergeant Ted Seymour 
 Betty Huntley-Wright as Betty Seymour 
 Julie Suedo as Thelma Monsell 
 Robert English as Colonel Gretton 
 Hannah Jones as Mrs. Brown 
 Granville Ferrier as Desborough 
 Georgie Harris as Briggs 
 Humberston Wright as Quartermaster

References

Bibliography
 Chibnall, Steve. Quota Quickies: The Birth of the British 'B' Film. British Film Institute, 2007.
 Low, Rachael. Filmmaking in 1930s Britain. George Allen & Unwin, 1985.
 Wood, Linda. British Films, 1927-1939. British Film Institute, 1986.

External links

1933 films
1933 crime films
Films directed by Edward Dryhurst
British black-and-white films
British crime films
1930s English-language films
1930s British films
Metro-Goldwyn-Mayer films
Quota quickies
Films shot at Cricklewood Studios